Vaibhav Singh Panwar (born 26 October 1992) is an Indian cricketer who played for Uttarakhand. He made his List A debut for Uttarakhand in the 2018–19 Vijay Hazare Trophy on 20 September 2018. He made his Twenty20 debut for Uttarakhand in the 2018–19 Syed Mushtaq Ali Trophy on 21 February 2019.

References

External links
 

1992 births
Living people
Indian cricketers
Uttarakhand cricketers
Sportspeople from Dehradun